Øystein Havang (born September 3, 1964) is a Norwegian handball player. He played 187 matches and scored 717 goals for the Norway men's national handball team between 1987 and 1997.  He participated at the 1993 and 1997 World Men's Handball Championships.

References

1964 births
Living people
Norwegian male handball players